The King Is Dead is the sixth studio album by The Decemberists, released on Capitol Records on January 14, 2011. Described as the "most pastoral, rustic record they've ever made" by Douglas Wolk of Rolling Stone, the album reached No. 1 on the U.S. Billboard 200 chart for the week ending February 5, 2011. The song "This Is Why We Fight" reached number 19 on the U.S Alternative Songs Chart, while the song "Down by the Water" also charted in the United States. In November 2011, the band released an EP of album out-takes, entitled Long Live the King.

Prior to the album's release, frontman Colin Meloy stated: "If there's anything academic about this record, or me trying to force myself in a direction, it was realising that the last three records were really influenced by the British folk revival [...] this whole world that I was discovering, that I was poring over, learning inside-out. It was a wanting to get away from that. And looking back into more American traditions, reconnecting with more American music."

Background
The King Is Dead was recorded during spring 2010, with most of it being made in a six-week period in a barn at an  site called Pendarvis Farm, near Portland, Oregon. It has been speculated that the album title is an homage to The Smiths' 1986 album The Queen Is Dead, largely due to Colin Meloy's long-touted influence from the band. It was co-produced by Tucker Martine. At least three of the ten songs—"Down by the Water", "Rise to Me" and "June Hymn"—were performed live in 2010. Meloy has said that a primary musical influence for much of The King Is Dead is R.E.M., and three songs, "Don't Carry It All", "Calamity Song" and "Down by the Water", feature the R.E.M. guitarist Peter Buck. The album was released on January 18, 2011. The King Is Dead has been called the "most pastoral, rustic record they've ever made" by Douglas Wolk of Rolling Stone. On January 26, 2011, it became their first No. 1 album on the U.S. album chart.

On November 1, 2011, the outtakes EP Long Live the King was released, collecting six songs recorded during these sessions.

Release and reception

The King Is Dead debuted atop the Billboard 200 and sold 94,000 copies in its first week, making it the band's most commercially successful album.

The album received positive reviews from critics. It received a 77 out of 100 on Metacritic, indicating "generally favorable reviews." Uncut placed the album at number 26 on its list of "Top 50 albums of 2011", while Rolling Stone ranked the album the 7th best of 2011.

Track listing

Personnel

According to the liner notes of The King Is Dead.

The Decemberists

Colin Meloy – vocals, acoustic guitar, 12-string guitar, baritone guitar, tenor guitar, harmonica, pump organ, percussion
Chris Funk – pedal steel, electric guitar, banjo, bouzouki
Jenny Conlee – piano, organ, accordion, Wurlitzer
Nate Query – bass guitar, cello
John Moen – drums, tambourine, shaker, percussion, backing vocals

Additional musicians
Peter Buck – mandolin on "Don't Carry It All", 12-string electric guitar on "Calamity Song", electric guitar and baritone guitar on "Down by the Water"
David Rawlings – backing vocals on "Don't Carry It All", "June Hymn" and "Dear Avery"
Gillian Welch – backing vocals on "Don't Carry It All", "Rise to Me", "Rox in the Box", "Down by the Water", "All Arise!", "June Hymn" and "Dear Avery"
Laura Veirs – backing vocals on "Dear Avery"
Annalisa Tornfelt – violin on "Don't Carry It All", "Rox in the Box" and "All Arise!"
Tucker Martine – tambourine on "Calamity Song"

Production
Produced by Tucker Martine with The Decemberists
Recorded and mixed by Tucker Martine
Mastered by Stephen Marcussen
Assistant engineering by Rich Hipp and Clinton Welander
Design by Jeri Heiden for SMOG Design, Inc.
Illustrations and lettering by Carson Ellis
Photography by Autumn de Wilde

Charts

Weekly charts

Year-end charts

Certifications

Release history

References

External links
"The King is Dead" at Decemberists.com
Tucker Martine official site

2011 albums
Capitol Records albums
Rough Trade Records albums
The Decemberists albums
Albums produced by Tucker Martine